The Whisky a Go Go (informally nicknamed The Whisky) is a historic nightclub in West Hollywood, California, United States. It is located at 8901 Sunset Boulevard on the Sunset Strip, corner North Clark Street, opposite North San Vicente Boulevard, northwest corner. The club has been the host for musicians and bands including Taj Mahal, Otis Redding, Hugh Masekela, Alice Cooper (who all recorded live albums there between 1966 and 1969), The Mothers of Invention, The Stooges, Parliament-Funkadelic, The Doors, Love, The Beach Boys, Cheap Trick, Golden Earring, No Doubt, System of a Down, The Byrds, The Flying Burrito Brothers, Chicago, Germs, Elton John, Oasis, Buffalo Springfield, Steppenwolf, Van Halen, Johnny Rivers, X, Led Zeppelin, Fleetwood Mac, KISS, Guns N' Roses, Death, AC/DC, Linkin Park, Metallica, Mötley Crüe, Stryper, and Phil Seymour.

History
In 1958, the first Whisky a Go Go in the United States opened in Chicago, Illinois, on the corner of Rush and Chestnut streets. It has been called the first real American discothèque. A franchise was opened in 1966 on M Street in the Georgetown section of Washington, D.C., by restaurateur Jacques Vivien.

It owes its name to the first discothèque, the Whisky à Gogo, (à gogo, meaning, in French, 'in abundance', 'galore'), established in Paris in 1947 by Paul Pacini (d. 2017), which itself took the name from the British novel Whisky Galore.

The Sunset Strip Whisky was founded by Elmer Valentine, Phil Tanzini, Shelly Davis, and attorney Theodore Flier and opened on January 16, 1964. In 1972, Valentine, Lou Adler, Mario Maglieri and others started the Rainbow Bar & Grill on the Sunset Strip. In 1966, Valentine, Adler and others founded The Roxy Theatre. Lou Adler bought into the Whisky in the late 1970s. Valentine sold his interest in the Whisky a Go Go in the 1990s but retained an ownership in the Rainbow Bar & Grill and the Roxy Theatre until his death in December 2008.

Although the club was billed as a discothèque, suggesting that it offered only recorded music, the Whisky a Go Go opened with a live band led by Johnny Rivers and DJ Rhonda Lane, spinning records between sets from a suspended cage at the right of the stage.

The Whisky a Go Go was one of the places that popularized go-go dancing. Elmer Valentine, in a 2006 Vanity Fair article, recalled arranging to have a female DJ play records between Rivers' sets so patrons could continue dancing. But because there was not enough room on the floor for a DJ booth, he had a glass-walled booth mounted high above the floor. A contest was held for the female DJ job but when the young winner called Valentine on the night of the opening and tearfully said her mother forbade her from doing it, Valentine recruited the club's cigarette girl, Patty Brockhurst. Valentine quickly hired two more female dancers, one of whom, Joanna Labean, designed the official go-go-girl costume of fringed dress and white boots.

Rivers rode the Whisky-born go-go craze to national fame with records recorded partly Live at the Whisky. In addition, The Miracles recorded the song "Going to a Go-Go" in 1966 (which was covered in 1982 by The Rolling Stones), and Whisky a Go Go franchises sprang up all over the country. Arguably, the rock and roll scene in Los Angeles was born when the Whisky started operation; because of its status as a historic music landmark, the venue was inducted into the Rock and Roll Hall of Fame in 2006.

The Whisky played an important role in many musical careers, especially for bands based in Southern California. The Byrds, Buffalo Springfield, Smokestack Lightnin', and Love were regulars, and The Doors were the house band for a while – until the debut of the "Oedipal section" of "The End" got them fired. Van Morrison's band Them had a two-week residency in June 1966, with The Doors as the opening act. On the last night they all jammed together on "Gloria". Frank Zappa's The Mothers of Invention got their record contract based on a performance at the Whisky. The Turtles performed there when their newest (and biggest-selling) single "Happy Together" was becoming a hit, only to lose their new bassist, Chip Douglas (who had arranged the song), to The Monkees; guitarist Michael Nesmith invited him to become their producer (he returned to the Turtles a year later, to produce them). Neil Diamond also played at the Whisky on occasion. Metallica bassist Cliff Burton was recruited by the band after they watched him play a show there with his band Trauma. At one point singer and actress E.G. Daily had a residency at the Whisky. On February 15, 1977, the Ramones played for the first time on this stage.

Arthur Lee of Love immortalized the Whisky in the song "Maybe the People Would Be the Times or Between Clark and Hilldale". "Here they always play my songs," he would sing on the side two opener of Forever Changes. The Whisky was located on the strip between the streets Clark and Hilldale. British rockers Status Quo also referenced the venue in their 1978 song "Long Legged Linda" with the lines, "Well, if you're ever in Los Angeles and you've got time to spare / Take a stroll up Sunset Boulevard, you'll find the Whisky there." Loggins and Messina sang about the club in their tune "Whiskey", found on their 1972 album Loggins and Messina. 

In 1966, the Whisky was one of the centers of what fans call the Sunset Strip police riots. In the mid-1970s, the Whisky hosted stage presentations, including the long-running show The Cycle Sluts. During the early 1990s, the Whisky hosted a number of Seattle-based musicians who would be a part of the grunge movement, including Soundgarden, Mudhoney, Melvins, Fitz of Depression and 7 Year Bitch. Tracks recorded from a February 12, 1992 concert of Hole appear on their EP, Ask for It (1995). In 1994 Oasis played a controversial set at the Whisky, with frontman Liam Gallagher visibly intoxicated. Immediately following the gig, lead songwriter Noel Gallagher temporarily left the group out of frustration, fleeing to San Francisco, where he penned the song "Talk Tonight". In 1997, System of a Down played at the Whisky. The band were unsigned at the time, and played songs from their early demo tapes, in particular containing the band's only live performance of the song "Blue".

On September 12, 2016, the Whisky a Go Go launched an official TV channel on the Roku Connected TV platform. The Whisky a Go Go channel opens the Whisky's doors to a global audience with live music videos, full concerts and related content spanning its 52-year history.

Honors
A gene that codes for a subunit of a common potassium ion channel was named for the establishment in the 1960s by William D. Kaplan and William E. Trout. The human Ether-à-go-go-Related Gene (hERG) was so named because when Drosophila flies with mutations in the Ether-à-go-go gene are anaesthetised with ether, their legs start to shake, like the dancing at the then popular Whisky a Go Go nightclub.

See also

Live at the Whisky a Go Go (disambiguation)
Otis Redding In Person at the Whisky a Go Go, an album recorded in 1966 at the venue
Hugh Masekela Is Alive and Well at the Whisky, a 1967 album by Hugh Masekela recorded live at the venue
The Troubadour
The Viper Room

References

External links

The History of The Whisky-A-Go-Go

Music venues in Los Angeles
Nightclubs in Los Angeles County, California
West Hollywood, California
Historic Rock and Roll Landmarks
Landmarks in Los Angeles
Music venues completed in 1964
1964 establishments in California